Aidan Jenniker  (born 3 June 1989) is a South African football (soccer) left-back for Premier Soccer League club Cape Town All Stars.

References

External links
Aidan Jenniker at Soccerway

1989 births
South African soccer players
Association football defenders
Living people
Cape Town Spurs F.C. players
Sportspeople from Cape Town
Cape Coloureds
Vasco da Gama (South Africa) players